San Casciano may refer to some Italian municipalities:

San Casciano dei Bagni, in the Province of Siena, Tuscany
San Casciano in Val di Pesa, in the Province of Florence, Tuscany
Azzurra Volley San Casciano, a women's volleyball club
San Casciano, Cascina, in the Province of Pisa, Tuscany
Rocca San Casciano, in the Province of Forlì-Cesena, Emilia-Romagna
San Cassiano, in the Province of Lecce, Apulia